Errol may refer to:

People with the given name
Errol Barnett (born 1983), anchor and correspondent for CBS News
Errol Barrow (1920–1987), first Prime Minister of Barbados
Errol Brown (1943–2015), British-Jamaican songwriter, lead singer of Hot Chocolate
Errol Étienne (born 1941), prominent Scottish artist
Errol Fuller (born 1947), English author on extinct animals
Errol Flynn (1909–1959), Australian-American film actor in the 1930s, 1940s and 1950s
"Errol" (song), a 1981 song in honour of Flynn, on rock band Australian Crawl's album Sirocco
Erroll Garner (1921–1971), American jazz pianist and composer of "Misty"
Errol Gulden (born 2002), Australian rules footballer (Sydney Swans)
Errol John (1924–1988), Trinidadian actor and playwright
Errol Le Cain (1941–1989), British animator and illustrator
Errol Lloyd (born 1943), Jamaican-born artist and writer
Errol Mann (1941–2013), former American NFL placekicker, 1968–1978
Errol Morris (born 1948), American filmmaker and writer
Errol Musk (born 1946), South African engineer and father of Elon Musk
Errol Sawyer (1943–2020), American photographer
Errol Spence Jr. (born 1990), American professional boxer and world champion
Errol James Livingston Taber (1877–1947), Justice of the Supreme Court of Nevada
Errol Tobias (born 1950), South African rugby union player
Errol Zimmerman (born 1986), Surinamese-Curaçaoan kickboxer

Fictional characters
Errol (Harry Potter), the Weasley family's owl in the fictional Harry Potter series
Errol, a swamp dragon in the Discworld novel Guards! Guards!
Errol, a character in the film Snatch
Errol, a character in the Chip 'n Dale Rescue Rangers episode "Love is a Many Splintered Thing"
Errol (originally spelt as Erol), an antagonist in Jak II and the main antagonist in Jak 3
Errol the Hamster, a British puppet that is often seen in many productions featuring Roland Rat

Places
Errol, Perth and Kinross, a village in Scotland
Errol, New Hampshire, a town in the United States

Other uses
Errol (album), an album by American rapper Haleek Maul

See also
Erroll
Earl (given name)
Earle (given name)
Erol, a Turkish male given name